The Wacissa River is a large, spring-fed stream located in south-central Jefferson County, Florida. Its headwaters are located about a mile south of the town of Wacissa, where the river emerges crystal clear from a group of large limestone springs. The river is managed by the Florida Fish & Wildlife Conservation Commission as part of the Aucilla Wildlife Management Area, and has been declared an Outstanding Florida Waterway by the Florida Department of Environmental Protection.

The Wacissa Springs 
The springs that feed the Wacissa River emerge in a bottomland forest below the Cody Scarp, a relic marine terrace marked by a line of hills to the north. According to the Florida Bureau of Geology, the group of springs

consist of at least 12 known springs scattered along the upper  of the Wacissa River. The area immediately adjoining the river and springs is densely forested with cypress, oak, some pine, and generally moderate undergrowth. The river is generally clear and cool, averaging 21 °C (70 °F) ... The distribution of springs in, as well as adjacent to, the Wacissa River and the heavy surface cover of aquatic plants makes difficult to impractical the reliable measurement [of the water flow] of individual springs ... The average flow [of the river] from August 1971 through September 1974 was 389 cubic feet per second.

Natural history 
The flora is typical for a freshwater swamp in the deep southeast; pond cypress and bald cypress dominate the banks, followed by sweetbay, maple, sweet gum, hickories and oaks, as well as magnolias, holly, willow, and sabal palms. The water itself is heavily vegetated. The exotics, Water hyacinth and hydrilla, dominate the upper reaches of the river. The spring runs themselves are often home to pickerel weed, arrowhead, elodea and eel grass. Wild flowers are also present, including several varieties of water lilies.

The Wacissa is well known for its large concentration of aquatic birds, including egrets, herons, ibis, osprey, wood storks, limpkins, anhingas, kingfishers, barred owls and bald eagles. Aquatic animals are also abundant, including alligators, river otters, turtles, water snakes, and crayfish. The main species of fish are bass, mullet, catfish, red-breasted sunfish, stumpknocker and gar, although the warmouth perch, speckled perch, flier bream, and shellcracker may also found in the Wacissa.

According to George L. Thurston III's 1976 report on the Wacissa for the Canoe Trail Atlas:

Although much of the Wacissa forest is now some 85 years into recovery, logging activities are still common in the area. Large portions of the adjacent lands—though managed by the state of Florida—are owned by the St. Joe Company. However, the company has agreed not to cut trees in the immediate vicinity of the river. Today, the Wacissa is used almost exclusively for recreational purposes, including swimming, boating, fishing and birdwatching.

References 

 
 

Rivers of Florida
Bodies of water of Jefferson County, Florida
Outstanding Florida Waters